The Sellers House is a historic house at 89 Acklin Gap in rural Faulkner County, Arkansas, northeast of Conway.  It is a single-story masonry structure, with a gabled roof, fieldstone exterior, and cream-colored brick trim.  It has a projecting front porch with arched openings, and its roof has Craftsman-style exposed rafter ends.  The house was built about 1940 by Silas Owens, Sr., a noted regional master mason.  This house exhibits his hallmarks, which include herringbone patterns in the stonework, cream-colored brick trim, and arched openings.

The house was listed on the National Register of Historic Places in 2005.

See also
National Register of Historic Places listings in Faulkner County, Arkansas

References

Houses on the National Register of Historic Places in Arkansas
Houses completed in 1940
Houses in Conway, Arkansas
National Register of Historic Places in Faulkner County, Arkansas